The Virginia Secession Convention of 1861 was called in Richmond to determine whether Virginia would secede from the United States, govern the state during a state of emergency, and write a new Constitution for Virginia, which was subsequently voted down in a referendum under the Confederate Government.

Background and composition

Abraham Lincoln's presidential election reflected the nation's sectional divide. Before his inauguration, Secessionist assembly majorities in the Deep South states resolved to secede from the United States and form the Confederate States of America if Lincoln won the election. Virginia was deeply divided over whether to join them, as were the eight states in the Upper South.

In May 1861 (Perhaps this date is incorrect. By May 1861, Virginia Delegates had already voted twice (1st against and 2nd for secession – see below), and it was put to a public vote and ratified on May 23, 1861), the Virginia Assembly called a special convention for the sole purpose of considering secession from the United States. The counties and cities returned a convention of delegates amounting to about one-third for secession and two-thirds Unionist. But the Unionists were divided between those labeled Conditional Unionists who would favor Virginia in the Union only if Lincoln made no move at coercion. Those who would then be called Unconditional Unionists were unwavering in their loyalty to the constitutional government of the United States.

The divisions in Virginia were apparent throughout the Southern United States in the campaigning for the 1860 election for U.S. President. Secessionists walked out of the national Democratic Party convention in Charleston and then again in Baltimore, Maryland. Those leaving Baltimore reconvened in Richmond to nominate a Southern Democrat, enslaver John C. Breckinridge. Having divided the once majority Congressional party, Breckinridge won Electoral College votes in seven Deep South states. With the addition of Arkansas, Delaware, Maryland, and North Carolina narrowly with 51.5%, Breckinridge won 72 Electoral College votes.

Secessionists in the South were variously both majorities and minorities in their state legislatures. They were influenced by the late political philosopher and South Carolinian U.S. Senator John C. Calhoun, who believed that the South had the right as a "section" of states, to require a "concurrent majority" between themselves and the national majority to choose a U.S. president. Without a majority of Southern Electoral College votes, they believed themselves competent to nullify a constitutional election. If not constitutionally yet, then as a matter of fairness and in defense of their slave-based civilization when faced with a Republican (Whig) presidency with Abolitionist political allies.

Within the 1860 South, there were sixteen states, those memorialized on the Secessionist banner above the Charleston, South Carolina Secessionist Convention. In nine states with secessionist majorities in their legislatures, Abraham Lincoln's name had been kept off the ballot, ensuring his inability to meet the Secessionist standard.

The Constitutional Unionist candidate was slaveholder John Bell, the former Whig U.S. Senator from Tennessee. He won three southern states with 39 Electoral College votes from Virginia, Kentucky, and Tennessee. The Unionist Northern Democrat Stephen A. Douglas, a sitting U.S. Senator from Illinois, carried two states. He carried only one from the South, Missouri, with 9 Electoral College votes. Douglas was the only candidate to campaign in person in both sections of the country. He had staked out a position for armed resistance to secession in the campaign's final days at his "Norfolk (Virginia) Doctrine". It was repeated on the stump in North Carolina and telegraphed across the country to every major newspaper.

In the November 1860 South, Union sentiment was a majority in seven states, with over 50% for Bell and Douglas combined. They included Missouri at 70.8%, Kentucky at 62.7%, Tennessee at 55.4%, Louisiana at 55.1%, Virginia at 54.3%, Maryland at 51.5%, Georgia at 51.2%, and two others, North Carolina narrowly under at 49.5%, and Arkansas at 46.9%. The divided South gave the secessionists pause in Congress. Despite an uncovered plot to assassinate Lincoln on his way to Washington, on the appointed day, a joint session of Congress chaired by Vice President John C. Breckinridge, with Southern state delegations present, certified the Electoral College vote choosing Abraham Lincoln. Lincoln was duly inaugurated under an armed guard commanded by Virginian General Winfield Scott but without the expected violence.

Meeting and debate
The convention met from February 3 – December 6, 1861, and elected John Janney its presiding officer. The majority initially voted to remain in the Union but stayed in session awaiting events. Conditional Unionists objected to Lincoln's call for state quotas to suppress the rebellion and switched from their earlier Unionist vote to secession on April 17. At the outset of the convention, the Confederate Congress sent three commissioners to address the convened delegates in the first week of the meeting. Fulton Anderson, a commissioner from Mississippi, warned that the Republican Party, now in control of the United States government, intended "the ultimate extinction of slavery and the degradation of the Southern people." Henry Lewis Benning, commissioner from Georgia, explained that Georgia had seceded because "a separation from the North was the only thing that could prevent the abolition of her slavery." The Virginia-born John Smith Preston, commissioner from South Carolina, insisted that when the North voted for Lincoln, it decreed annihilation of white Southerners, who must act in self-defense, and Virginia should lead the Southern host in an independent Confederacy. His speech brought the convention to a standing ovation, but only a third of the delegates were for immediate secession. The Conditional Unionists awaited some overt act of aggression from Lincoln before deciding to secede.

At first, the speeches were mixed between Secessionists advocating leaving the Union, Conditional Unionists holding onto the patriotism of earlier times, and Unconditional Unionists insisting that secession was bad policy and unlawful. In the second week of the convention debate on February 28, Jeremiah Morton of the Piedmont's Orange County made an early speech for secession. The abolitionists' fanaticism was "inculcated in the Northern mind and ingrained in the Northern heart, so that you may make any compromise you please, and still, until you can unlearn and unteach the people, we shall find no peace…for thirty years they have been warring upon the fifteen States of the South."  He questioned whether slavery could be safe with Black Republicans taking over all branches of the Federal Government. The Union was already dissolved, and Virginia would surely go with her Southern brethren. If the Confederacy "give us the post of danger, they will also give us the post of honor. They want our statesmen; they want our military; they want the material arm of Virginia to sustain ourselves and them in the great struggles [before us]."

On March 4, Abraham Lincoln's inauguration day, Jefferson Davis called up 100,000 militia to serve a year and sent besieging troops to surround Fort Sumter in South Carolina and Fort Pickens in Florida. In his inaugural speech, Lincoln supported the Corwin Amendment to constitutionally guarantee Congress would not interfere with slavery in the states where it currently existed. That same day Waitman T. Willey from trans-Alleghany Monongalia County answered Morton with a Unionist speech. He defended Virginia's institutions from those seeking to abolish slavery. Still, he sought to bring Virginia's "oppressors to acknowledge those errors and to redress her grievances. ... The remedy proposed by gentlemen on the other side is secession, [But] there is no constitutional right of secession". He warned that secession would bring about war, taxes, and the abolition of slavery in Virginia. As long as Virginia stayed in the Union, the "wandering" states of the Confederacy might return to the United States.

John S. Carlile of transmontane Alleghany County, like Willey, an Unconditional Unionist, stressed that western Virginians were committed to slavery as "essential to American liberty." But he would not run away from devotion to the Union. "This government that we are called upon to destroy has never brought us anything but good. No injury has it ever inflicted on us. No act has ever been put upon the statute book of our common country, interfering with the institution of slavery in any shape, manner or form, that was not put there by and with the consent of the slave-holding States of this Union". If Virginia joined the Confederacy, the North would no longer be bound by the Constitution to stand by slavery and slave-holding states, and it would join with England, France, and Spain to extinguish slavery everywhere. Thomas Jefferson's grandson, George Wythe Randolph, now a Richmond lawyer, made a secessionist speech, observing that although the Republicans had captured the United States Government "in strict accordance with Constitutional forms", it was merely sectional. "The Government, then…is constitutionally revolutionized, and requires a counter-revolution to restore it." But "Let [Virginia's industries] go with us into a Southern Confederacy, and receive protection from Northern industry, and they will be what they ought to be—the manufacturers and miners of a great [Southern] nation." We should go into the Confederacy, "we are told it will bring war. On the contrary it will tend to avert war…Neutrality is impossible and would be dishonorable."

Throughout March 21–23, John Brown Baldwin of the Valley's Augusta County made a Unionist speech, beginning with a defense that "African slavery, as it exists in Virginia, is a right and a good thing". But he believed that the idea that the election of someone to the Presidency could justify secession "as a direct assault upon the fundamental principles of American liberty". The three branches of government, with their Constitutional checks and balances, protect against "encroachment upon the liberties of the minority of the people or upon the rights of the States." And even with the withdrawal of Southern delegations, the remaining Republican majority passed a Constitutional Amendment for ratification prohibiting the Federal Government to interfere with slavery in the states in any respect. "...the great masses of people, leaving out the politicians and fanatics of both sections, have this day an earnest yearning for each other, and for peace and Union with each other…" Baldwin sought a conference of border states to adopt the Peace Convention recommendations that he believed would cause the Confederate states to separately return to the Union.

John S. Barbour Jr. of Culpeper County, Virginia was the first Unionist to break away into the secessionist camp. While "resolutely protecting slave labor", he supported encouraging manufacturing and commercial interests in Virginia. He asked what would do more to promote Virginia's growth, participation "in a hostile confederacy in which your [legislative] power will be but 11 out of 150 [with the North], or in a friendly confederacy where it will be 21 out of 89 [with the South]?" In the South was a government to join "in full working order, strong, powerful and efficient". Along with a number of secessionist speakers, former governor Henry A. Wise, the most influential delegate, tried to move the convention into a "Spontaneous Southern Rights Convention" to install a secessionist government in Virginia immediately. Still, on April 4, almost two-thirds of the convention voted against secession. A three-person delegation was sent to consult with Lincoln, who had resolved to protect Federal property in the South.

With the fall of Fort Sumter, Lincoln matched Jefferson Davis's call of 100,000 men for a year with a federal call for 75,000 for three months, including 3,500 Virginians to restore Federal property taken in the South by force. Unionists sought to delay any military action on secession that would violate Virginia's neutrality until the people's referendum approved it, as mandated in the Assembly's call to the convention. But the Unionist bloc lost its Conditional Unionist faction with the Lincoln requisition of troops. The new secessionist majority resolved the convention into a secret session on April 16. Unionists warned that precipitating secession and war would lead to Northern support of abolition and the end of slavery in Virginia. The next day, former Governor Henry Wise announced that he had set the "wheels of revolution" against the U.S. Government in motion with loyal Virginians seizing both the Harper's Ferry federal armory and the Gosport Navy Yard at Norfolk. Wise, who had participated as the second in a fatal duel in 1838 in which a U.S. Representative from Maine was killed, drew his horse pistol at the podium and waved it in the air as his speech progressed. Wise intended to persuade the recalcitrant small enslavers from the Piedmont and Valley who had previously voted to remain in the Union with his words and deeds. Most of the Convention's Conditional Unionists then joined the secessionist camp, and the resolution for Virginia to secede passed 88–55, with nine delegates not voting after the Henry Wise remonstrance.

Outcomes

The Virginia Secession Ordinance was to "repeal the ratification of the Constitution of the United States of America, by the State of Virginia." That Constitution had been "perverted to their injury and oppression…not only to the injury of the people of Virginia, but to the oppression of the Southern slave-holding states." Two days after the secession resolution and a month before the referendum, the Confederate flag was raised over Virginia's capitol building, a delegation was sent to vote in the Confederate Congress, state militias were activated, and a Confederate army was invited to occupy Richmond. While the ballots from Unionist counties were lost, the total referendum votes counted numbered more than that of the 1860 presidential election by including men voting viva voce aloud in Confederate army camps, approving secession by 128,884 to 32,134. The "War in defense of Virginia", as the General Assembly names the ensuing conflict, failed, as did secession and the Confederate promise of slavery into the twentieth century.

The Convention on June 29, 1861, expelled Unconditional Unionists William G. Brown and James Clark McGrew (who represented transmontane Preston County) for participating in the Wheeling Convention in May, although others had actually attended that convention (which later led to West Virginia statehood). On election day, October 24, 1861, five Preston County men in a Confederate camp in Pocahontas County elected secessionist lawyers Robert E. Cowan and Charles J. P. Cresap to replace Brown and McGrew, while voters actually in Preston County that day elected Charles Hooton and William B. Zinn (both of whom attended the May and July 1861 Wheeling Convention sessions) to represent them at the Constitutional Convention in Wheeling. Unionist George W. Summers, who had represented Kanawha County several times in the Virginia General Assembly as well as the 27th and 28 Congresses before becoming a judge, also resigned and was succeeded by Andrew Parks.

After formal succession, one of the first pieces of legislation from the convention was the creation of the Provisional Army of Virginia.

Chart of delegates
The one hundred and fifty-two delegates to the Virginia Secession Convention of 1861 were elected in 1861 from House of Delegate districts. The vote for secession failed on April 4. Following Lincoln's call up of militia to retake federal property and call on Virginia to contribute, the conditional unionists voted for secession, and the resolution passed. The two votes are visualized in maps from the University of Richmond.

See also
 Virginia Conventions

Notes

References

Bibliography

Further reading (most recent first)

External links
Journal of the acts and proceedings of a general Convention of the State of Virginia … 1861 ebook free online.

Virginia in the American Civil War
Political history of Virginia
1861 in Virginia
1861 conferences
Secession crisis of 1860–61